Chokaa is an administrative ward in the Chunya district of the Mbeya Region of Tanzania. In 2016 the Tanzania National Bureau of Statistics report there were 16,782 people in the ward, from 15,227 in 2012.

Villages / vitongoji 
The ward has 4 villages and 19 vitongoji.

 Mapogoro
 Ashishila
 Mapogoro A
 Mapogoro B
 Mnyolima
 Wafugaji
 Kibaoni
 Kibaoni A
 Kibaoni B
 Kibaoni C
 Majengo
 Sinza
 Chokaa
 Chokaa A
 Chokaa B
 Legezamwendo
 Sambilimwaya
 Godima
 Godima
 Ikamasi
 Majengo
 Mwankonyonto
 Saitunduma

References 

Wards of Mbeya Region